The Best Remixes of CK is the first remix album by R&B and pop singer Crystal Kay. It was released on December 16, 2009 in Japan. The album contains remixes of various singles from Kay's career and includes remixes by popular Japanese producers such as Genki Rockets and Shinichi Osawa. The album contains three previously unreleased tracks including the "Oddity Remix" of "After Love", which had been used in commercials for Tully's Coffee earlier in the year.

Track listing 
 
 "Boyfriend" (80kidz Remix)
 "After Love: First Boyfriend" (Oddity Remix) (featuring Kaname)
 "Teenage Universe: Chewing Gum Baby" (Remix)
 "Girl's Night" (Shinichi Osawa Layer 7 Remix)
 "Think of U" (KZ Future Disco Mix)
 "Hard to Say" (TinyVoice Production Remix)
 "Do U Like It" (Extended Mix: Fantastic Plastic Machine) (featuring M-Flo)
 
 
 "Shining" (Jazztronik Remix)
 
 "One" (Cornelius Remix)

References

External links 
 Official Website

Crystal Kay albums
2009 remix albums
Epic Records remix albums